Ian James Mosey (born 29 August 1951) is an English professional golfer.

Early life
Mosey was born in Keighley, West Riding of Yorkshire, and is the son of cricket writer Don Mosey.

Professional career
Mosey turned professional in 1972 and spent almost twenty years on the European Tour, during which his best Order of Merit ranking was 29th, achieved in both 1984 and 1986. He won two tournaments on the European Tour, the 1980 Merseyside International Open and the 1984 Monte Carlo Open.

Mosey also played in South Africa in the offseason and won two titles in nearby countries. He joined the European Seniors Tour in 2001, but has not won at that level.

Professional wins (4)

European Tour wins (2)

*Note: The 1984 Monte Carlo Open was shortened to 36 holes due to fog.

European Tour playoff record (1–0)

Sunshine Tour wins (2)

Results in major championships

Note: Mosey only played in The Open Championship.

CUT = missed the half-way cut (3rd round cut in 1972, 1974 and 1983 Open Championships)
"T" = tied

References

External links

English male golfers
European Tour golfers
Sunshine Tour golfers
European Senior Tour golfers
Sportspeople from Keighley
1951 births
Living people